Charitum Montes is a large group of mountains in the Argyre quadrangle of Mars, located at 58.4° south latitude and 40.29° west longitude.  It is 850 km across and was named after a classical albedo feature name. Charitum Montes has gullies in some areas.

References

External links
Charitum Montes: a cratered winter wonderland - ESA

Argyre quadrangle
Mountains on Mars